The Family That Dwelt Apart is a 1973 Canadian animated short by Yvon Malette. It was narrated by E.B. White, and produced by Wolf Koenig and Robert Verrall for the National Film Board of Canada.

Summary
Based on the 1937 short story "Preposterous Parables; III The Family Which Dwelt Apart" by E. B. White, it is about the misadventures of a family of seven who live in happy isolation on a small island in Barnetuck Bay, until word gets out that they are in distress.

Accolades
The Family That Dwelt Apart was named Best Animated Film at the 25th Canadian Film Awards. It received the Silver Hugo at the 1973 Chicago International Film Festival. It was also nominated for an Academy Award for Best Animated Short Film award at the 47th Academy Awards, losing to the  Claymation short Closed Mondays.

References

External links
 Watch The Family That Dwelt Apart at NFB.ca
 
 The Family That Dwelt Apart on BCDB

1973 films
National Film Board of Canada animated short films
Quebec films
Films based on short fiction
Films set in New Jersey
Best Animated Short Film Genie and Canadian Screen Award winners
Works by E. B. White
1970s animated short films
1973 animated films
Films scored by Eldon Rathburn
Films set in the 1930s
English-language Canadian films
1970s Canadian films